Yan Tin Estate is a public housing estate in Tuen Mun, New Territories, Hong Kong located behind Siu Hong Court. It consists of five residential blocks, ranging in height from 33 to 38 storeys, and the Yan Tin Shopping Centre. It provides 4,688 rental flats catering to an approximate population of around 13,000. Tenant intake began on 23 March 2018.

Houses

Politics
Yan Tin Estate is located in Yan Tin constituency of the Tuen Mun District Council. It is currently represented by Apple Lai Ka-man, who was elected in the 2019 elections.

See also

Public housing estates in Tuen Mun
Tsz Tin Tsuen

Further reading
 
 2010 Hong Kong Government notices about the complex clearance of part of Tsz Tin Tsuen to make way for Yan Tin Estate, then referred to as "Tuen Mun Area 54 Site 2":

References

Tuen Mun
Public housing estates in Hong Kong
Residential buildings completed in 2018
2018 establishments in Hong Kong